St Paul's Gaelic Football Club is a GAA club in Lurgan, County Armagh, Northern Ireland. It plays Gaelic football at various age levels in Armagh GAA competitions, and is currently in the Armagh Intermediate Football Championship. Its ground is The Playing Fields.

History
St Paul's was founded in 1971 in the Taghnevan housing estate in Lurgan, and seven years later won the county Junior Championship. The high point of the club's footballing history came in 1984, when it won the county Intermediate title.

Honours
 Armagh Intermediate Football Championship (2)
 1984, 2014
 Armagh Junior Football Championship (1)
 1978
 Armagh Intermediate Football League (1)
 2014

Notable players
 Mark Wilson

Facilities
St Paul's new playing fields were opened on 20 May 2012, with a challenge match between Armagh and Down. The Social Club hosts many community and cultural events.

References

External links
St Paul's GFC website
Armagh GAA website

Gaelic games clubs in County Armagh
Gaelic football clubs in County Armagh